Álvaro de Mendoza, O.F.M. or Alvaro Mendoza (died 1631) was a Catholic prelate who served as Bishop of Jaca (1628–1631) and earlier as Bishop of L'Aquila (1622–1628).

Biography
Álvaro de Mendoza was ordained a priest in the Order of Friars Minor.
On 14 November 1622, he was appointed Bishop of Aquila by Pope Paul V.
On 20 November 1622, he was consecrated bishop by Giovanni Garzia Mellini, Cardinal-Priest of Santi Quattro Coronati with Benedetto Bragadin, Archbishop of Corfu, and Cesare Ventimiglia, Bishop of Terracina, Priverno e Sezze, serving as co-consecrators. 
On 29 May 1628, he was appointed during the papacy of Pope Urban VIII as Bishop of Jaca.
He served as Bishop of Jaca until his death in 1631.

References

External links and additional sources
 (for Chronology of Bishops)
 (for Chronology of Bishops)

17th-century Roman Catholic bishops in Spain
Bishops appointed by Pope Paul V
Bishops appointed by Pope Urban VIII
1631 deaths
17th-century Italian Roman Catholic bishops